Dolemite is a 1975 American blaxploitation crime comedy film and is also the name of its principal character, played by Rudy Ray Moore, who co-wrote the film and its soundtrack. Moore, who started his career as a stand-up comedian in the late 1960s, heard a rhymed toast about an urban hero named Dolemite from a regular at the record store where he worked, and decided to adopt the persona as an alter ego in his act.

Plot
Dolemite is a pimp, comedian, and nightclub owner who is serving twenty years in prison after being set up by a rival, Willie Green (D'Urville Martin), and framed by detectives Mitchell and White, at the direction of the mayor (Hy Pyke). Released by the governor (thanks to lobbying by fellow pimp "Queen Bee" (Lady Reed), Dolemite is freed in order to discover the source of the out of control drug problem in the "Fourth Ward" of the city, and take revenge on the corruption that put him in prison. He rekindles his reputation on the streets while trying to get back his "Total Experience" club from the hands of Willie Green. He enlists the help of Queen Bee and his own stable of karate-trained prostitutes to settle the score, while an undercover FBI agent (Jerry Jones) lurks in the shadows, viewing the proceedings.

Cast
 Rudy Ray Moore as Dolemite
 Lady Reed as "Queen Bee"
 D'Urville Martin as Willie Green
 West Gale as Reverend Gibbs
 John Kerry as Detective Mitchell
 Jerry Jones as Blakely
 Hy Pyke as Mayor Daley
 Vainus Rackstraw as "Creeper"

Production
Moore first developed the character of Dolemite in his stand-up comedy routines, and the character later appeared on Moore's 1970 debut album, Eat Out More Often, which reached the top 25 on the Billboard 200. He released several more comedy albums using this persona. In 1975, Moore decided to create a film about Dolemite, paying for most of the production out of his own pocket, and using many of his friends and fellow comedians as cast and crew. The film was directed by D'Urville Martin, who appears as the villain Willie Green.

Release

Critical reception
On review aggregator Rotten Tomatoes, the film holds an approval rating of 57% based on 14 reviews, with an average score of 5/10. On Metacritic, the film received a score of 67 based on 6 reviews, indicating "generally favorable reviews".

Home media
Dolemite was released to DVD on September 13, 2005, by Xenon Pictures and also as part of a boxed set (The Dolemite Collection) on the same date.  A widescreen, high definition remastered version, from an original print of the film, was released on Blu-ray disc on April 26, 2016, by Vinegar Syndrome. The prior VHS and DVD releases from the early-1990s were incorrectly transferred with an open matte, which revealed the boom mic at the top of the frame frequently (with the correct matte in a theatrical presentation, this area would have been covered).  Over the years, the appearance of the boom mic due to the oversight during the VHS and DVD transfer was the source of amusement by viewers, and in acknowledgement of this, the Blu-ray also features an open matte version as an alternate "boom mic" presentation.

Legacy
A sequel, The Human Tornado, was released in 1976. A second sequel, The Return of Dolemite, was released in 2002 and was later re-titled The Dolemite Explosion for DVD release. A quasi-sequel, Shaolin Dolemite, starring Rudy Ray Moore as Monk Ru-Dee, was released in 1999.

The action comedy movie Black Dynamite (2009) parodies Dolemite and other blaxploitation films.

A biographical film about Moore and the making of Dolemite, titled Dolemite Is My Name and starring Eddie Murphy as Rudy Ray Moore, was released theatrically and on Netflix in October 2019.

In popular culture
The song "Glare" on Big Chief's album Drive It Off (1991) opens with a quote from the film: "I'm gonna let 'em know that Dolemite is my name, and f***in' up motha f***as is my game!"

The film “The Great White Hype” shows the love scene from Dolemite as the grim reaper roper (Damon Wayans) is preparing for the main fight. He refuses to fight until he sees the scene and is angry when his trainer shuts off the film. 

Snoop Dogg mentions Dolemite in his final verse on Dr. Dre's 1992 single "Nuthin' but a 'G' Thang", the late Chilly B of Newcleus raps that he "learned to rock like Dolemite" in "Jam On It", and the character has also been name dropped in songs by Wu Tang Clan, Eazy-E, Beastie Boys, Lupe Fiasco, Fugees, and A$AP Rocky. Additionally, a number of rappers, including Too $hort, Luther Campbell, Big Daddy Kane, and Del the Funky Homosapien have given testimony to Moore's influence on them and on rap generally.

The video for Got Your Money by Ol' Dirty Bastard and Kelis features clips of this movie.

Comedian Aries Spears riffed on the Dolemite character during his time on MadTV.

Schoolly D's "Signifying Rapper" was inspired by Moore's version.

A sample of Dolemite was used as the intro for the song "Wit My Crew x 1987" by Lil Uzi Vert, included on his 2015 mixtape Luv Is Rage.

The Futurama episode Jurassic Bark makes reference to a fictional mineral called "Dolemite", describing it as "the tough, black mineral that won't cop out when there's heat all about."

See also
 "Got Your Money"
 List of blaxploitation films
 Black Dynamite

References

External links

 

 
2006 SuicideGirls interview with Rudy Ray Moore by Daniel Robert Epstein

1975 films
1970s action films
Blaxploitation films
American action comedy films
African-American films
1975 directorial debut films
Dimension Pictures films
1970s English-language films
1970s American films